Area Code 212 is the second album by American jazz group the String Trio of New York recorded in 1980 for the Italian Black Saint label. The albums was recorded at Barigozzi Studio in Milan on November 25 and 26, 1980

Reception
The AllMusic review awarded the album 4½ stars.

Track listing
 "Twixt C and D" (John Lindberg) - 6:58
 "Strawberries" (Lindberg) - 
 "Echovamp" - (Billy Bang) - 5:15
 "Coho" (James Emery) - 8:17
 "Bang's Bounce" (Bang) - 5:57
 "Abjunctinuity" (Emery) - 6:57

Personnel
Billy Bang – violin
James Emery – guitar
John Lindberg – bass

References

Black Saint/Soul Note albums
String Trio of New York albums
1980 albums